The women's lightweight double sculls rowing event at the 2011 Pan American Games was held October 15–18 at the Canoe & Rowing Course in Ciudad Guzman. The defending Pan American Games champion was Yaima Velázquez & Ismaray Marerro of Cuba.

Schedule
All times are Central Standard Time (UTC-6).

Results

Heat 1

Final A

References

Women's rowing at the 2011 Pan American Games